Rudy Guélord Bhebey-Ndey (born 9 March 1990) is a Congolese former professional footballer who played as a forward for AC Léopards.

International career 
In January 2014, coach Claude Leroy invited Ndey to be a part of the Congo national squad for the 2014 African Nations Championship. The Congo were eliminated in the group stage after losing to Ghana, drawing with Libya and defeating Ethiopia, with Ndey himself scoring the only goal in that match.

Spinal cord injury 
Ndey had a career-ending spinal cord injury on 26 July 2015 in a match against Zamalek SC at the 2015 CAF Confederation Cup. He arrived at the hospital with "serious damage to his spinal column between his fifth and sixth vertebra, a blow to the spinal cord, breathing difficulties and a cerebral hemorrhage".

After emergency surgery, he was sent to France to help speed up his recovery. The injury rendered him tetraplegic and put a stop to his career.

References

External links
 
 

1986 births
2014 African Nations Championship players
AC Léopards players
FC Zorya Luhansk players
Ukrainian Premier League players
Republic of the Congo A' international footballers
Association football forwards
Living people
People with tetraplegia
Republic of the Congo footballers
Republic of the Congo people with disabilities
Republic of the Congo international footballers
Republic of the Congo expatriate footballers
Expatriate footballers in Ukraine
Republic of the Congo expatriate sportspeople in Ukraine
Republic of the Congo expatriate sportspeople in Gabon
Expatriate footballers in Gabon